Melvin Laurance Morse (February 23, 1921 – November 7, 2003) was an American microbiologist. He is notable for his experiments (with Esther Lederberg and Joshua Lederberg) in specialized transduction.

Professional associations
 American Society for Microbiology
 American Association for the Advancement of Science

References

External links 
 To view the thirty-year correspondence between M. Laurance Morse and Esther M. Lederberg, see http://www.estherlederberg.com/EImages/Archive/ArchiveIndex.html; click the entry for  "Morse, M. Laurance".
 University of Colorado School of Medicine obituary for M. Laurance Morse: https://web.archive.org/web/20110929191729/https://www.cu.edu/sg/messages/2708.html

1921 births
2003 deaths
People from Hopkinton, Massachusetts
University of Wisconsin–Madison alumni
University of New Hampshire alumni
University of Kentucky alumni
American microbiologists
American geneticists
Phage workers